John Joseph Dougherty (September 16, 1907 – March 20, 1986) was a bishop of the Catholic Church in the United States. He served as an auxiliary bishop of the Archdiocese of Newark from 1963 to 1982. He was president of Seton Hall University from 1959 to 1969.

Biography
Born in Jersey City, New Jersey, John Dougherty was ordained a priest for the Archdiocese of Newark on July 23, 1933.

On November 17, 1962 Pope John XXIII appointed him as the Titular Bishop of Cotenna and Auxiliary Bishop of Newark. He was consecrated a bishop by Archbishop Thomas Boland on January 24, 1963. The principal co-consecrators were Bishop James McNulty of Paterson and Newark Auxiliary Bishop Martin Stanton.

Dougherty attended two of the four sessions of the Second Vatican Council (1962–1965). He continued to serve as an auxiliary bishop until his resignation was accepted by Pope John Paul II on September 18, 1982.

He died at the age of 78 on March 20, 1986.

References

1907 births
1986 deaths
Clergy from Jersey City, New Jersey
20th-century American Roman Catholic titular bishops
Participants in the Second Vatican Council
Catholics from New Jersey